Luís Vinícius de Menezes, more famously known as Vinício (born 28 February 1932) is a professional football player, who played as a centre forward. Although he is a Brazilian, Vinício played his entire career in Italy, and because of this, he was excluded from the Brazil national side, in a similar manner to José Altafini; unlike Altafini, however, Vinício chose not to play for the Italian national side. Following his professional footballing career, he later became a manager, who became known for introducing tactics based on Dutch total football in Italy.

Playing career
Vinício was born in Belo Horizonte, Brazil. At age 23 he came to Italy, joining the Naples representative club Napoli during the 1955–56 season. He style was considered generous and powerful on the field, which soon gained him the nickname 'O lione (lion) from the Napoli faithful. In total for the club he played 152 games and scored 69 goals in a 5-year period.

He moved on next to Bologna in 1960; he performed well during his first season with the club, during which he managed to win the Mitropa Cup in 1961, but during the successive season, Vinício was used less frequently, due to competition from youngster Harald Nielsen.

In the summer of 1962 he returned disconsolate to Brazil, after finding little football action in recent years with Bologna. However, soon he was recalled to Italy from the management of Lanerossi Vicenza, who offered him a new contract. To Vinício, joining Vicenza was like a second birth in Italian football.

After an average first year, he re-found his form, and became extremely prolific in front of goal, scoring 17 goals in the 1963–64 season, which helped the club to a 6th place finish in Serie A. In 1964–65 his performances were still decisive, as he helped Vicenza to a tenth place finish in championship. The following season, he scored 25 goals, finishing the season as the Serie A top scorer; his top-scoring record of 25 goals in a single Serie A campaign would not be equalled again until Marco van Basten in 1991–92.

In the summer of 1966, he left Vicenza because Helenio Herrera signed Vinício to play for Internazionale. His tenure in nerazzurro did not bring much luck however; he competed only 8 games for the club and scored one goal.

For the final season of his playing career, he returned to Vicenza at age 36. This season saw him take his total goal scoring record, for all games player in Serie A during his career to over 150 goals.

Coaching career
Following his professional footballing career, Vinício later became an experienced football manager, coaching many different clubs, including Lazio and Napoli; he won the 1971–72 Serie C title while coaching Brindisi, and narrowly missed out on the Serie A title during his time with Napoli, leading a side which became renowned for their exciting attacking football, inspired by the Dutch Total Football, in an era in which defensive catenaccio tactics still dominated Italy.

Style of management
Vinício was known for his exciting attacking football tactics, which were inspired by Dutch Total Football, and which he introduced in Italy in an era in which defensive catenaccio tactics, which made use of man–to–man marking, still dominated in Italian football. His teams were known for using a fluid and attractive attacking style of play, as well as heavy pressing, the offside trap, and a zonal marking defensive system; during his time with Napoli, he usually employed a 4–4–2 formation, and made use of an offensive sweeper (normally Tarcisio Burgnich) as one of his team's central defenders, who was required to push forward and advance into midfield in order to start attacking plays.

References

External links
 Profile at Enciclopedia del Calcio

Brazilian football managers
Brazilian footballers
Brazilian expatriate footballers
Botafogo de Futebol e Regatas players
S.S.C. Napoli players
L.R. Vicenza players
Bologna F.C. 1909 players
Inter Milan players
Serie A players
S.S. Lazio managers
S.S.C. Napoli managers
Udinese Calcio managers
S.S. Juve Stabia managers
Expatriate footballers in Italy
Association football forwards
1932 births
Living people
Footballers from Belo Horizonte